John T. Magner was a professional baseball outfielder. He played one game in Major League Baseball for the Cincinnati Reds on July 14, 1879.

External links

Major League Baseball outfielders
Baseball players from Missouri
Cincinnati Reds (1876–1879) players
19th-century baseball players
1855 births
Year of death missing